Kristoffer H (born 24 February 1977) is a Danish former professional footballer and now manager, who currently is the manager of Næsby BK. He has played 24 games and scored one goal for various Danish national youth teams, including seven games for the Denmark national under-21 football team.

In his playing career, Johannsen played for a number of Danish clubs. He played one game in the Danish Superliga for FC Copenhagen in May 1995. 
In the winter 1995, he moved from FC Copenhagen to Brøndby IF. He did not play any first team games for Brøndby, and moved to AB in the winter 1997. He played for Odense Boldklub in 1998. In 1999, Johannsen moved to Dutch club FC Emmen where he played until the summer 2003. He played in B 1913 in the 2003–04 season. He played in Vejle BK from January 2005 to December 2006, before moving to FC Fredericia. In October 2009, he signed on as an assistant coach at FC Fredericia. In May 2011 he became new manager of Otterup B&IK in the Danish 2nd Division West. In 2013, he stepped down as manager of Otterup to become new manager of Dalum IF. His contract as Dalum manager was not renewed, when it ended in the summer of 2017. He then became manager of lower league club OKS. He has also played for Odense Boldklub.

He is also a teacher at Efterskolen Ved Nyborg (EVN) where he coaches the football-line.

References

External links
DBU Profile

Danish men's footballers
1976 births
Living people
Akademisk Boldklub players
F.C. Copenhagen players
FC Emmen players
Odense Boldklub players
Vejle Boldklub players
Association football midfielders
Boldklubben 1913 players
Danish football managers
Dalum IF managers
Næsby Boldklub managers